Jon Burnside is a Canadian politician and former police officer who was elected to represent Ward 16 Don Valley East on Toronto City Council following the 2022 municipal election. Burnside is the chair of the Toronto Transit Commission (TTC). He previously represented Ward 26 Don Valley West from 2014 to 2018.

Background

Prior to his election to council, Burnside worked as a police officer and later launched his own meal delivery company.

Political career

Burnside first ran for city council in Ward 26 in the 2010 election, losing narrowly to incumbent councillor John Parker. He defeated Parker in the 2014 election.

He ran unsuccessfully for re-election as councillor in the 2018 election in the newly constituted Ward 15 Don Valley West against fellow incumbent councillor Jaye Robinson. The new ward has the same boundaries as the provincial and federal riding with the same name. 

In the 2022 Toronto municipal election, Burnside ran for election as councillor in the neighbouring Ward 16 Don Valley East. Based on preliminary results, CP24 and the Toronto Star, among others, projected that Burnside would win the ward shortly after polls closed on October 24. Burnside was appointed by Mayor John Tory as the chair of the TTC on November 24, 2022.

Electoral history

References

Toronto city councillors
Living people
Year of birth missing (living people)
Place of birth missing (living people)
Toronto police officers